Alice Grófová (married name Chladeková), is a female former Czechoslovak international table tennis player.

She won a silver medal in the women's singles and a bronze medal in the mixed doubles  with Josef Dvořáček at the 1973 World Table Tennis Championships.

She also won an English Open title.

See also
 List of table tennis players
 List of World Table Tennis Championships medalists

References

Slovak female table tennis players
World Table Tennis Championships medalists